OPEX Corporation is a manufacturing company based in Moorestown, New Jersey. They primarily manufacture warehouse automation equipment, high volume mailroom automation equipment, document scanners, and remittance processors.  Their warehouse automation products have been implemented at retail and e-commerce companies such as: HBC, BOXED, and iHERB

OPEX employs approximately ~1600 people throughout the world with locations in Moorestown Township, New Jersey USA, Plano, Texas, Bolton, England, Villebon Sur Yvette, France, and Wiesbaden, Germany.

References

External links
OPEX Corporation
Press Releases on ThomasNet

Companies based in Burlington County, New Jersey
Moorestown, New Jersey
Technology companies based in New Jersey